Walking Man is a 1974 album by James Taylor.

Walking Man may also refer to:

 The Walking Man (French: L'homme qui marche), a famous sculpture by the world-renowned French sculptor Auguste Rodin ca. 1877
 L'Homme Qui Marche I (English: Walking Man I), a bronze sculpture created by Swiss sculptor Alberto Giacometti in 1961.
 Walking Man (Borofsky sculpture), a 17m-tall sculpture by Jonathan Borofsky in Munich's Leopoldstraße
 A planned five-book cycle of novels by Mo Hayder, started in 2008.
 The Walking Man (manga), a manga by Jiro Taniguchi.
 Eddie Yost, a professional baseball player nicknamed the "Walking Man" for the numerous bases on balls he drew.
 The Walking Man (Adrian Saint), a character in Simon R. Green's Nightside (book series)
 Joseph Kromelis, a Chicago street vendor.

See also
 Dead Man Walking (disambiguation)
 Randall Flagg, nicknamed "The Walkin' Dude", a character in several of Stephen King's works